A referendum on freemasonry was held in Switzerland on 28 November 1937. Voters were asked whether they approved of a popular initiative that would ban the practice. The proposal was rejected by a majority of voters and cantons.

Background
The referendum was a popular initiative, which required a double majority; a majority of the popular vote and majority of the cantons. The decision of each canton was based on the vote in that canton. Full cantons counted as one vote, whilst half cantons counted as half.

Results

References

1937 referendums
1937 in Switzerland
Referendums in Switzerland
Freemasonry in Switzerland